"Boys Will Be Boys" is a song by American rock band The Hooters, which was released in 1993 as the second single from their fifth studio album Out of Body. The song was written by Rob Hyman, Eric Bazilian and Cyndi Lauper, and produced by Joe Hardy, Bazilian and Hyman. Lauper also provides guest vocals on the song.

Background
"Boys Will Be Boys" was co-written with Cyndi Lauper, who also contributed guest vocals on the track. She first worked with Hyman and Bazilian on the recording of her 1983 debut album She's So Unusual, which included the Hyman/Lauper-penned "Time After Time". Hyman and Bazilian collaborated with Lauper again for her fourth album Hat Full of Stars (1993) by performing on the album and co-writing five of the tracks, including the single "That's What I Think".

The Hooters originally suggested Lauper record the song herself. Bazilian told The News Journal in 1993: "We thought this would be great for Cyndi. She liked the song, but thought it was better for us, but she did sing on it." The song begins with a ten-second rendition of the chorus of "Wild Mountain Thyme".

Critical reception
In a review of Out of Body, Barbara Jaeger of The Record described the song as an "Irish-inflected rocker" which with "Twenty Five Hours a Day" gets the album "off to a brilliant start". John Everson of the Southtown Star considered the song to be the Hooters' "playful answer" to "Girls Just Want to Have Fun", with Lauper's appearance "brighten[ing] up the proceedings". Scott Benarde of The Palm Beach Post felt the collaboration between the Hooters and Lauper was a "winning formula" on the "muscular pop-rock tune". Ira Robins of Trouser Press described the song as an "ebullient number that could have gone on Lauper's first album".

Track listing
CD single
"Boys Will Be Boys" - 4:30
"All Around the Place" - 3:45
"Thing of Beauty" - 3:23

Personnel
Boys Will Be Boys
 Eric Bazilian - lead vocals, guitars, bass guitar, recorder, bass melodica
 Rob Hyman - synth, accordion, triangle, vocals
 Mindy Jostyn - violin, string arrangement
 David Uosikkinen - drums, tambourine

Additional musicians
 Cyndi Lauper - guest vocals

Production
 Joe Hardy - producer, engineer, mixing
 Eric Bazilian, Rob Hyman - producers, engineers
 Erik Flettrich - assistant engineer
 George Marino - mastering

Charts

References

1993 songs
1993 singles
American pop rock songs
The Hooters songs
Cyndi Lauper songs
MCA Records singles
Songs written by Rob Hyman
Songs written by Eric Bazilian
Songs written by Cyndi Lauper